In general topology, set theory and game theory, a Banach–Mazur game is a topological game played by two players, trying to pin down elements in a set (space).  The concept of a Banach–Mazur game is closely related to the concept of Baire spaces.  This game was the first infinite positional game of perfect information to be studied. It was introduced by Stanisław Mazur as problem 43 in the Scottish book, and Mazur's questions about it were answered by Banach.

Definition

 Each member of  has non-empty interior.

 wins if and only if

Otherwise,  wins.
This is called a general Banach–Mazur game and denoted by

Properties
 If  is a complete metric space,  has a winning strategy if and only if  is comeager in some non-empty open subset of 
 The siftable and strongly-siftable spaces introduced by Choquet can be defined in terms of stationary strategies in suitable modifications of the game.

Then  is siftable if and only if  has a stationary winning strategy in 

It follows that each weakly -favorable space is a Baire space.

Many other modifications and specializations of the basic game have been proposed: for a thorough account of these, refer to [1987].

The most common special case arises when  and  consist of all closed intervals in the unit interval. Then  wins if and only if  and  wins if and only if . This game is denoted by

A simple proof: winning strategies
The following result gives a flavor of how the proofs used to derive the properties in the previous section work:

Proposition.  has a winning strategy in  if  is countable,  is T1, and  has no isolated points.

Proof. Index the elements of X as a sequence:   Suppose  has chosen  if  is the non-empty interior of  then  is a non-empty open set in  so  can choose  Then  chooses  and, in a similar fashion,  can choose  that excludes .  Continuing in this way, each point  will be excluded by the set  so that the intersection of all  will not intersect .

Similar effects happen if  is equipped with indiscrete topology and 

A stronger result relates  to first-order sets.

Proposition.  has a winning strategy in  if and only if  is meagre.

This does not imply that  has a winning strategy if  is not meagre. In fact, if  is a complete metric space, then  has a winning strategy if and only if there is some  such that  is a comeagre subset of  It may be the case that neither player has a winning strategy: let  be the unit interval and  be the family of closed intervals in the unit interval. The game is determined if the target set has the property of Baire, i.e. if it differs from an open set by a meagre set (but the converse is not true).  Assuming the axiom of choice, there are subsets of the unit interval for which the Banach–Mazur game is not determined.

References
 [1957] Oxtoby, J.C. The Banach–Mazur game and Banach category theorem, Contribution to the Theory of Games, Volume III, Annals of Mathematical Studies 39 (1957), Princeton, 159–163
 [1987] Telgársky, R. J. Topological Games: On the 50th Anniversary of the Banach–Mazur Game, Rocky Mountain J. Math. 17 (1987), pp. 227–276.
 [2003] Julian P. Revalski The Banach–Mazur game: History and recent developments, Seminar notes, Pointe-a-Pitre, Guadeloupe, France, 2003–2004

External links
 

Topological games
General topology
Descriptive set theory
Determinacy